The Heart of Humanity is a 1918 American silent war propaganda film produced by Universal Pictures and directed by Allen Holubar. The film stars Dorothy Phillips, William Stowell, and Erich von Stroheim.

Overview
The film "follows the general theme and construction of the D. W. Griffith film Hearts of the World and, in places, parallels [its] plot". The film was made toward the end of World War I and is known for showcasing von Stroheim as a lecherous 'Hun'.

Cast
 Dorothy Phillips - Nanette
 William Stowell - John Patricia
 Robert Anderson - Paul Patricia
 Walt Whitman - Father Michael
 Margaret Mann - Widow Patricia
 Erich von Stroheim - Eric von Eberhard
 Lloyd Hughes - Jules Patricia
 Frank Braidwood - Maurice Patricia
 George Hackathorne - Louis Patricia
 Pat O'Malley - Clancy
 William Welsh - Prussian Officer
 Lieutenant Smith - Canadian Officer
 Joseph W. Girard - Canadian Colonel
 Valerie Germonprez - Red Cross Ambulance driver
 Gloria Joy 
 Tom London (billed as Leonard Clapham)

Plot
Nanette (Dorothy Phillips), an American girl living in a small Canadian village, is in love with John Patricia (William Stowell), the eldest of five brothers. The war interrupts their romantic idyll, as everyone goes overseas to Belgium and France. Nanette becomes a Red Cross nurse and is terrorized by the evil Prussian Lt. von Eberhard (Erich von Stroheim). It is up to John to save her from the Hun's advances.

Reception
The New York Times criticized the "theatricalities and sentimental artificialities of his plot" but characterized "some of [Holubar]'s battle panoramas [as] among the most comprehensive and vivid ever reproduced on the screen." It pointed out that "children add to the charm and effectiveness of some of the scenes, and their costumes and acting reveal that intelligence and care in direction elsewhere evident in the production. One receives the impression, however, that the making of a few of the scenes in which the children appear was not very good for the children."

Preservation status
A copy of the film is preserved at the EmGee Film Library and in private collections. It was exhibited at the Museum of Modern Art in 2014.

References

External links

 
 

1918 films
1918 drama films
American silent feature films
American war drama films
American World War I propaganda films
American black-and-white films
Films directed by Allen Holubar
Universal Pictures films
1910s American films
Silent American drama films
Silent war drama films